This is a list of airports in the Democratic Republic of the Congo, sorted by location.

Airports 

Airport names shown in bold indicate the airport has scheduled service on commercial airlines.

See also 
 Transport in the Democratic Republic of the Congo
 List of airports by ICAO code: F#FZ - Democratic Republic of the Congo (DRC), formerly known as Zaire
 Wikipedia: WikiProject Aviation/Airline destination lists: Africa#Congo, Democratic Republic of the

References

External links 
 Lists of airports in the Democratic Republic of the Congo:
 Great Circle Mapper
 World Aero Data
 Aircraft Charter World

Congo
 
Airports
Airports
Congo, Democratic Republic of the